Josephine R. "Josie" Abady (August 21, 1949 – May 25, 2002) was an American stage director, film director, and producer.

Early life and education
Abady was born in New York. Her mother Nina Abady (née Friedman) was a civil rights activist and Alabama-born of Mizrahi Jewish (Syrian Jewish) descent who worked full time to support her three kids after Aaron’s father who was of Sephardic Jewish (Lebanese-Jewish) descent, and passed away. Her sister is actress Caroline Aaron.

Abady graduated from Syracuse University and earned her MFA from Florida State University.

Theatrical career
Abady taught theater at Bennington College and was head of the theater program at Hampshire College in Amherst, Massachusetts before she began her professional career as the artistic director of the Berkshire Theater Festival (in Stockbridge, Massachusetts). She opened the season at the Cleveland Play House with a revival of Born Yesterday, starring Ed Asner and Madeline Kahn, a production that moved to Broadway.

From 1994 to 1996, Abady was one of the two artistic directors of the Circle in the Square Theatre, along with Theodore Mann.

Film and TV work
Abady also did film and TV work, including, with the assistance provided by an American Film Institute grant, To Catch a Tiger, a short film inspired by the life of Nina Friedman Abady, Abady's own mother. She later co-produced a TV remake of A Raisin in the Sun, which starred Esther Rolle and Danny Glover.

Last years
Despite her advanced breast cancer, she was active during the last years of her life, until her death, at her home in Manhattan, aged 52.

Affiliations
Member, League of Professional Theatre Women

References

External links

1949 births
2002 deaths
American theatre directors
Women theatre directors
American theatre managers and producers
American people of Hungarian-Jewish descent
American people of Lebanese-Jewish descent
Artists from Richmond, Virginia
American Ashkenazi Jews
Deaths from cancer in New York (state)
Deaths from breast cancer
Florida State University alumni
American Mizrahi Jews
People from Stockbridge, Massachusetts
People from Manhattan
American Sephardic Jews
Syracuse University College of Visual and Performing Arts alumni
Bennington College faculty
Hampshire College faculty